Paracraga amianta is a moth in the family Dalceridae. It was described by Harrison Gray Dyar Jr. in 1909. It is found in Guyana. The habitat consists of tropical moist forests.

The length of the forewings is 11.5 mm. Adults have been recorded on wing in February.

References

Moths described in 1909
Dalceridae